Savay (Saray) is a village in Osh Region of Kyrgyzstan. It is part of the Kara-Suu District. Its population was 3,964 in 2021. It is on the border with Uzbekistan, across from the Uzbek town Sultonobod.

References

Populated places in Osh Region